Devins is a surname. Notable people with the surname include:

Bianca Devins (2001–2019), American murder victim
Jimmy Devins (born 1948), Irish politician and doctor
Patrick Devins, fictional character

See also
Devin (name)